Pool A of the 2018 Fed Cup Asia/Oceania Zone Group I was one of two pools in the Asia/Oceania zone of the 2018 Fed Cup. Four teams competed in a round robin competition, with the top team and the bottom team proceeding to their respective sections of the play-offs: the top team played for advancement to the World Group II Play-offs, while the bottom team faced potential relegation to Group II.

Standings 

Standings are determined by: 1. number of wins; 2. number of matches; 3. in two-team ties, head-to-head records; 4. in three-team ties, (a) percentage of sets won (head-to-head records if two teams remain tied), then (b) percentage of games won (head-to-head records if two teams remain tied), then (c) Fed Cup rankings.

Round-robin

Kazakhstan vs. Hong Kong

China vs. India

Kazakhstan vs. India

China vs. Hong Kong

Kazakhstan vs. China

India vs. Hong Kong

References

External links 
 Fed Cup website

2018 Fed Cup Asia/Oceania Zone